Elvenes is a village in Sør-Varanger Municipality in Troms og Finnmark county, Norway. It is located at the mouth of the river Pasvikelva where it flows into the Bøkfjorden, a southern branch of the Varangerfjorden. The town of Kirkenes lies about a  drive to the northwest.

History

During the Occupation of Norway by Nazi Germany a camp for Soviet prisoners-of-war was located in Elvenes, and in 1942 about six hundred Norwegian teachers were sent to Elvenes for slave labour.

Road bypass

As part of an NOK 875 million programme of improvements to European Route E105, work started in 2014 on a bypass to the north of the village comprising a new 284-metre bridge over the Bøkfjorden and a 690-metre tunnel through the adjacent Trifonhøgda mountain. The bridge has a 500-tonne steel central arch span of 120 metres, which was constructed in Wilhelmshaven, Germany and will be transported by barge along the entire west and north coast of Norway into the fjord. The section of road between Elvenes and the Russian border at Storskog was constructed in 2013, while the bridge and tunnel are expected to open by September 2017.

References

Villages in Finnmark
Sør-Varanger
Populated places of Arctic Norway